The name le Peletier (also spelled Lepeletier or Lepelletier) may refer to:

People

Amédée Louis Michel le Peletier, comte de Saint-Fargeau (1770–1845), French entomologist
Edmond Lepelletier (1846–1913), French journalist, poet and politician
Louis-Michel le Peletier, marquis de Saint-Fargeau (1760–1793), French politician

Other

Le Peletier (Paris Métro), stop on the Paris Métro
Lepelletier gear mechanism, three degrees of freedom epicyclic gear mechanism
Salle Le Peletier, home of the Paris Opera, 1821-1873